St. Peters College was a Church of England Voluntary Aided School in Chelmsford, Essex. The school was a specialist arts college.

History
The school began as Rainsford Secondary Modern School in 1939, a C of E school.

The school closed in August 2011, with pupils transferring to Chelmer Valley High School.

Alumni

Rainsford Secondary Modern School
 Sir Geoff Hurst, 1966 World Cup footballer, who played for West Ham
 Mark Dixon (businessman), founder of global serviced office business, Regus
Michael Brennan, murderer of Paul Simons in May 2013.

See also
 List of secondary schools in Essex

References

External links
St Peters College

Defunct schools in Essex
Defunct Church of England schools
Educational institutions established in 1939
1939 establishments in England
Educational institutions disestablished in 2011
2011 disestablishments in England
Schools in Chelmsford